Władysław Kiełbasa (born December 31, 1893 in Nowy Sącz – September 2, 1939 in Mikołów) was a Lieutenant Colonel (Podpułkownik) of the Polish Army.

He fought in the Polish-Soviet War, where he was seriously wounded, and later in World War II.

On the first day of World War II, German troops invaded Upper Silesia from the directions of Gliwice. Władysław Kiełbasa was part of the "Silesia" operational group, which was in turn part of the Kraków Army. While leading a counterattack against German forces between the towns of Mikołów and Wyry, part of an operation to withdraw Polish units behind the Przemsza River, Kiełbasa was struck by shrapnel and killed.

He was awarded several medals including the Virtuti Militari (Class V and IV), Krzyż Niepodległości (Cross of Independence), Krzyż Kawalerski (Cavalier's Cross), Krzyż Walecznych (Cross of Valor) twice, and the Cross of Merit (Gold) twice.

References
 Jarosław Ptaszkowski,  Ostatni bój pułkownika Władysława Kiełbasy, Stowarzyszenie „Pro Fortalicium”, Śląski Zeszyt Historyczny 2005

1893 births
1939 deaths
Polish Army officers
Polish military personnel killed in World War II
Polish people of the Polish–Soviet War
Recipients of the Virtuti Militari
Recipients of the Cross of Independence
Recipients of the Cross of Valour (Poland)
Recipients of the Cross of Merit (Poland)